Aq Bolagh-e Morshed (also Romanized as Āq Bolāgh-e Morshed; also known as Āgh Bolāgh-e Morshed and Āq Bulāq Murshīd) is a village in Mehraban-e Sofla Rural District, Gol Tappeh District, Kabudarahang County, Hamadan Province, Iran. At the 2006 census, its population was 607, in 125 families.

References 

Populated places in Kabudarahang County